Al Jazeera Media Network (AJMN) (Arabic: الجزيرة‎, romanized: al-jazīrah, IPA: [æl (d)ʒæˈziːrɐ]; , referring to the Qatar Peninsula) is a Qatari international state-owned public media conglomerate headquartered at Qatar Radio and Television Corporation Complex in Wadi Al Sail, Doha. It is the parent company of International Arabic news channel Al Jazeera and other similarly branded factual media operations. Initially launched as an Arabic news and current affairs satellite TV channel, it has since expanded into a network with several outlets, including the internet and specialty television channels in multiple languages and beyond. The chairman is Sheikh Hamad bin Thamer Al Thani. The acting director general is Mostefa Souag.

The organisation is a "private foundation for public benefit" under Qatari law. Under this organisational structure, it receives funding from the State of Qatar and according to media scholar Tine Ustad Figenschou, while both Al Jazeera and Qatari officials stress that the network is politically and editorially independent, this independence is "relative and conditional." The network is sometimes perceived to have mainly Islamist perspectives, promoting the Muslim Brotherhood, and having a pro-Sunni and an anti-Shia bias in its reporting of regional issues. Al Jazeera has aired videos and audio recordings of Osama bin Laden.

The network's news operation currently has 70 bureaus around the world that are shared between the network's channels and operations, the second-largest amount of bureaux of any media company in the world after the BBC. In June 2017, the Saudi, Emirati, Bahraini, and Egyptian governments, supported by 12 other OIC member governments (with initial rumours claiming the support of additional governments; later reduced to 9 member governments by the latest of August 2019), pressed for the closure of the entire conglomerate as one of thirteen demands made to the government of Qatar during the 2017-2021 Qatar diplomatic crisis. Other media networks have spoken out in support of the network.

History

Launch
The original Al Jazeera Satellite Channel (then called JSC or Jazeera Satellite Channel) was launched on 1 November 1996. This was following the closure of the first BBC Arabic language television station, then a joint venture with Orbit Communications Company, owned by Saudi King Fahd's cousin, Khalid bin Faisal Al Saud. The BBC channel had closed after a year and a half when the Saudi government attempted to thwart a documentary pertaining to executions under sharia law.

The Emir of Qatar, Sheikh Hamad bin Khalifa, provided a loan of QAR 500 million ($137 million) to sustain Al Jazeera through its first five years, as Hugh Miles detailed in his book Al Jazeera: The Inside Story of the Arab News Channel That Is Challenging the West.

Al Jazeera's first day on the air was 1 November 1996. It offered 6-hours of programming per day; this would increase to 12 hours by the end of 1997. It was broadcast to the immediate neighborhood as a terrestrial signal, and on cable, as well as through satellites (which was also free to users in the Arab world). 1 January 1999 was Al Jazeera's first day of 24-hour broadcasting. Employment had more than tripled in one year to 500 employees, and the agency had bureaux at a dozen sites as far as EU and Russia. Its annual budget was estimated at $25 million at the time.

Expansion

Al Jazeera English

In 2001, Al Jazeera was the singular international news network in Kabul, Afghanistan. Especially after 9/11, the demand for the English translation of Al Jazeera had increased. Therefore, Al Jazeera started to think about a service in the English language.

In late 2002, the director of marketing of Al Jazeera, Ali Mohamed Kama began to push a "repositioning" of Al Jazeera, "accompanied by the introduction of English subtitles and dubbing of broadcast into English."
In 2003, Al Jazeera hired its first English-language journalists, among whom was Afshin Rattansi, from the BBC's Today Programme.

In March 2003, it launched an English-language website (see below). The name of the website was "Al Jazeera Net"; it was launched by younger journalists. The site published various stories covered by the network, but it was not depending on Arabic-language channels and websites. The website aimed to connect to the Western audience, cooperate with BBC, and be "a global citizen's home page."

However, twelve hours after the launch of the website, "Al Jazeera Net" was kept offline due to many denials of service attacks. Over twenty-four hours later, "Al Jazeera Net" came back online however, Freedom Cyber Force Militia hacked the website to redirect web browsers to a picture of the American flag with a slogan saying that "Let Freedom Ring". After that, "Al Jazeera Net" came to be without a secured place to host because three of Al Jazeera's web providers, Horizons Media, Information Services, and Akamai Technologies canceled the contract. Also in March, Yahoo and AOL stopped advertising contracts with Al Jazeera. Therefore, the English-translated website was put off later in 2003.

On 4 July 2005 Al Jazeera officially announced plans to launch a new English-language satellite service to be called Al Jazeera International. The new channel started at 12h GMT on 15 November 2006 under the name Al Jazeera English and has broadcast centers in Doha (next to the original Al Jazeera headquarters and broadcast center), London, Kuala Lumpur and Washington D.C. The channel is a 24-hour, 7-days-a-week news channel, with 12 hours broadcast from Doha, and four hours each from London, Kuala Lumpur, and Washington D.C. Among its staff were journalists hired from ABC's Nightline and other top news outfits. Josh Rushing, a former media handler for CENTCOM during the Iraq war, agreed to provide commentary; David Frost was also on board. In an interesting technical feat, the broadcast of the new operation was handed off between bases in Doha, London, Washington, D.C., and Kuala Lumpur on a daily cycle.

The new English language venture faced considerable regulatory and commercial hurdles in the North America market for its perceived sympathy with extremist causes. At the same time, others felt Al Jazeera's competitive advantage lay in programming in the Arabic language. There were hundreds of millions of potential viewers among the non-Arabic language speaking Muslims in Europe and Asia, however, and many others who might be interested in seeing news from the Middle East read by local voices. If the venture panned out, it would extend the influence of Al Jazeera, and tiny Qatar, beyond even what had been achieved in the station's first decade. In an interesting twist of fate, the BBC World Service was preparing to launch its own Arabic language station in 2007.

Al Jazeera Balkans

In 2011 Al Jazeera Media Network created Al Jazeera Balkans, a version of Al Jazeera in the Bosnian/Croatian/Serbian language(s) stationed in Sarajevo, Bosnia and Herzegovina catering to and broadcasting around the Balkans.

Al Jazeera Turk

In 2013 they announced the creation of Al Jazeera Türk, a version of Al Jazeera in the Turkish language(s), stationed in Istanbul, and catering to and broadcasting around Turkey. On January 22, 2014, Al Jazeera Türk's website was launched with news content. The move made Al Jazeera Türk the first 24-hour news operation to go digital before broadcast. The Website shut down in 2017 without the channel being launched.

Al Jazeera America

Al Jazeera America was an American version of Al Jazeera English. The channel launched on 20 August 2013 exclusively on cable and satellite systems in the United States.

On 2 January 2013, Al Jazeera Media Network announced that it purchased Current TV from its founders Al Gore, Joel Hyatt, and Ronald Burkle, in the United States and would be launching an American news channel. Originally 60% of the channel's programming would be produced in America while 40% would be from Al Jazeera English, which later changed to almost all the content being U.S. originated.

Though Current TV had large distribution throughout the United States on cable and satellite TV, it averaged only 28,000 viewers at any time. The acquisition of Current TV by Al Jazeera allowed Time Warner Cable to drop the network due to its low ratings, but released a statement saying that they would consider carrying the channel after they evaluated whether it made sense for their customers. The channel was later added to Time Warner and Bright House Networks lineups after a new carriage deal was agreed upon.

On January 13, 2016, Al Jazeera America CEO Al Anstey announced that the network would cease operations on April 12, 2016, citing the "economic landscape".

Al Jazeera Sports

In 2004 Al Jazeera expanded into the world of sports with the establishment of Al Jazeera Sports (now known as beIN Sports) and the building of 8 Arabic language specialty sports channels.

On 1 January 2014, Al Jazeera Sports was renamed beIN Sports after it along with all of the organisation's non-news and current affairs assets were spun off and privatised into beIN Media Group; the channels were legally spun off to have consistency with all the Network's sports properties. According to Kate O'Brian, President of Al Jazeera America, Al Jazeera Sports revenue helped fund the network when it was in operation similar to how BBC Worldwide helps fund the BBC.

JeemTV and Baraem
 
On September 9, 2005, Al Jazeera established a children's division with the launch of Al Jazeera Children's Channel (since 2013 it was known as JeemTV). The channel targets an audience of 7 to 15-year-olds and broadcasts 24 hours a day.

On January 16, 2009, Baraem launched, the channel targets an audience of 3 to 7-year-olds and broadcasts 17 hours a day (6 am to 11 pm Doha time).

On April 1, 2016, both JeemTV and Baraem were acquired by beIN Media Group and were made part of beIN Channels Network. Since then, as a result, the channels were no longer free to view and made exclusive to beIN Channels Network.

Other channels
Al Jazeera Media Network also operates Al Jazeera Documentary Channel an Arabic language documentary channel, Al Jazeera Mubasher, a live politics and public interest channel (similar to C-SPAN, Houses of the Oireachtas Channel or BBC Parliament), which broadcasts conferences in real time without editing or commentary the first channel of its kind in the Middle East.

Restructuring

Al Jazeera restructured its operations to form a network that contains all their different channels. Wadah Khanfar, then the managing director of the Arabic Channel, was appointed as the Director-General of the Al Jazeera Network. He also acted as the managing director of the Arabic channel. Khanfar resigned on 20 September 2011, proclaiming that he had achieved his original goals and that eight years was enough time for any leader of an organization, in an interview aired on Aljazeera English.

On 26 November 2009, Al Jazeera English received approval from the CRTC, which enables Al Jazeera English to broadcast via satellite in Canada.

In 2011, in accordance with the renaming of the corporation, AJMN was legally re-designated from a "public institution to a 'private institution of public utility'"; however, it was unknown how this would affect editorial management and funding. The network is also funded through its television contracts and revenue from its sports division.

Al Jazeera and the 2011 Arab Spring 
Al Jazeera covered the Arab spring more than any other news outlets and had a significant role in spreading the Arab uprising.
Al Jazeera was the leading media spreading the news about unrest in a small city in Tunisia throughout the Middle East in 2011.

People in the Middle East have heavily relied on Al Jazeera to obtain news about their regions and the world even more than YouTube and Google. Hillary Clinton, who at the time of the Arab Spring was the U.S. Secretary of State stated that "Al-Jazeera has been the leader in that [it is] literally changing people’s minds and attitudes. And like it or hate it, it is really effective."

The news of unrest in the Arab states was broadcast by Al Jazeera in Arabic for the Arab world as well as in English for the audiences from the rest of the world.

In Tunisia, Ben Ali regime banned Al Jazeera from operating in the country, but with the help of Facebook users inside Tunisia, Al Jazeera was able to access reports from the events such as protests and government crackdowns that were taking place inside the country. The intensive media coverage of people's uprising against their leaders by Al Jazeera mobilized more people from other parts of the country to join the revolution.

The population in other Arab countries such as Bahrain, Egypt, Yemen, Libya, Syria also mobilized against their governments influenced by the Tunisian's successful revolt which was extensively covered by Al Jazeera in local languages. The international opinion also came to support the Arab movements in the Middle East since Al Jazeera English covered and reported governmental human right abuses against political activists and even ordinary citizens in the Middle East.

Subsidiaries

Television
Al Jazeera media network operates a number of specialty channels besides its original flagship news channel.

Al Jazeera network's TV channels include (d):

Other operations

Mobile
Al Jazeera Media Network also operates mobile apps for their various channels with Al Jazeera Mobile and Al Jazeera New Media

Online
The network operates Aljazeera.com which is the main website for the Al Jazeera English, Al Jazeera Balkans and the former Al Jazeera America web sites. For its Arabic language properties, it has Aljazeera.net. and for its Turkish properties Aljazeera.tr.

On January 1, 2018, Al Jazeera launched a Mandarin-language news website becoming the first Middle Eastern news provider to target the Chinese audience. The staff of the project is in contact with their audience via Chinese social media like Weibo, Meipai and WeChat.

AJ+

Al Jazeera Media Network also has a digital online-only news channel AJ+. The channel is an online and mobile-only news channel primarily found on various social media networks and YouTube and operated by Al Jazeera New Media out of San Francisco, California. The channel consists of mostly On Demand content. It soft-launched on 13 June 2014 with a new webpage, Facebook page and videos on YouTube. The full channel launched with an app in September 2014. There are also Arabic and Spanish language versions of the channel.

Al Jazeera Podcasts

In 2017, the network launched a podcasting network called Jetty. Later renamed Al Jazeera Podcasts, the network is available via the network's website as well as SoundCloud, Apple Podcasts, Stitcher, TuneIn, and iHeartRadio. The network is based out of San Francisco alongside AJ+ and is available in English.

Rightly
In 2021, the network launched Rightly, an online news channel aimed at center-right American conservatives. The channel much like AJ+ is only available online, primarily on YouTube. The launch of the channel spurred questions from Al Jazeera staff questioning if the channel took away from Al Jazeera's mission to be non-partisan and from various media critics wondering if conservative audiences would watch a channel from Al Jazeera, a long time target of American conservatives.

Education
Al Jazeera Media Network owns and operates the Al Jazeera Center for Studies Al Jazeera Center for Studies. Established in 2006, the Al Jazeera Center for Studies conducts in-depth analysis of current affairs at both regional and global levels. Its research agenda focuses primarily on geopolitics and strategic developments in the Arab world and surrounding regions. The center with an extensive network of distinguished researchers, and a wide range array of experts from across the globe, the center aims to promote dialogue and build bridges of mutual understanding and cooperation between cultures, civilizations, and religions.

The center also contains the Al Jazeera Media Training and Development Center.

Al Jazeera International Documentary Film Festival

The Al Jazeera International Documentary Film Festival Aljazeera International Documentary Film Festival is an annual film festival held at the Doha Sheraton in Doha, Qatar.  The first festival was held on 18 April 2005. Every year the festival has a different theme. The vision of the festival is to make the festival an invitation.... to introduce different cultures from all over the world, foster better relationships through an exchange of experiences and knowledge thus creating a foundation of respect and understanding. Al Jazeera seeks to make the festival become a place where filmmakers from different countries and cultures meet to create a unique platform that celebrates creative talent and encourages a cultural interest in documentary films.

The festival endeavors to promote creative talent from all over the world and in this way, leave behind a unique stamp of originality and professionalism.

The Al Jazeera Balkans Documentary Film Festival' was started in 2018 as an annual international documentary film festival based in Sarajevo, Bosnia and Herzegovina.

Lawsuits against AT&T
Al Jazeera Media Network sued AT&T in 2013 for refusing to carry its United States channel, claiming this was in violation of their contract. The two sides later settled in 2014 leading to the channel being added on AT&T's U-Verse systems.

Al Jazeera Media Network sued AT&T over contracts AT&T tried to illegally pursue in 2003.

See also

 Al Jazeera controversies and criticism
 Al Jazeera effect

References

External links
Official website
Official timeline
Al Jazeera Media Network Blog
Al Jazeera Media Network Tech 
Al Jazeera Media Network Tech 

Al Jazeera
1996 establishments in Qatar
Conglomerate companies of Qatar
Arab mass media
Multinational companies
Television in Qatar
Mass media companies established in 1996
Mass media in Doha
Companies based in Doha
Publicly funded broadcasters